Thomas Elliot MBE (6 April 1926 – 3 May 1998) was a Scotland international rugby union player. His regular playing position was Prop.

Rugby Union career

Amateur career

Elliot was born into a farming family in the Scottish Borders. He was educated at St. Mary's School, Melrose and at Loretto School, Musselburgh. After school he joined Gala RFC and played for the 2XV at lock. He soon moved to loose-head prop and over the next fifteen years made the position his own. Early in his career he gained a reputation for rumbustious play. Bill McLaren described him as "a tough rugged son of the soil".

Provincial career

Elliot was capped by South of Scotland District.

International career

Elliot made his debut for Scotland in the 1955 Five Nations Championship. Scotland beat  14–8 at Murrayfield. His next match against  resulted in another victory at the same venue.

In the 1956 Five Nations Championship he played all four matches. Scotland won one match against France at Murrayfield. The following year Scotland won two matches in the 1957 Five Nations Championship; Elliot played in every match. He played two matches in the 1958 Five Nations Championship, losing to Wales and Ireland.

Elliot was selected for the 1955 British Lions tour to South Africa, alongside his compatriot and fellow prop Hugh McLeod. If it were not for the outstanding Meredith brothers from Wales, they would have played in the Test matches. As it was Elliot played eight of the midweek games. He also played for the Barbarian F.C.

Farming career
Elliot had farming interests in the Borders and Sutherland. He was a former president of the Selkirk branch of the National Farmers Union of Scotland, and former president of the Borders area. His animals often won championships at the Royal Highland Show near Edinburgh, of which he became a director. Elliot was also a past president of the Cheviot Sheep Society, member of the government's Hill Farming Advisory Committee and a director of the Moredun Foundation. For his contributions to farming he was awarded an MBE in 1989.

References

1926 births
1998 deaths
People educated at St. Mary's School, Melrose
People educated at Loretto School, Musselburgh
Scottish rugby union players
Scotland international rugby union players
British & Irish Lions rugby union players from Scotland
Gala RFC players
Barbarian F.C. players
Members of the Order of the British Empire
South of Scotland District (rugby union) players
Rugby union players from Galashiels
Rugby union props